The New York Institute of Technology College of Osteopathic Medicine (NYIT-COM) is a private medical school located primarily in Old Westbury, New York. It also has a degree-granting campus in Jonesboro, Arkansas. Founded in 1977, NYIT-COM is an academic division of the New York Institute of Technology. Formerly the New York College of Osteopathic Medicine, it is one of the largest medical schools in the United States.

History

The college opened in 1977, as the first osteopathic medical school in the state of New York, offering the Doctor of Osteopathic Medicine degree (D.O.).  The college was established through the efforts of Dr. W. Kenneth Riland, an osteopathic physician (D.O.), and New York State Governor Nelson A. Rockefeller and members of the Rockefeller family.  The college was granted accreditation by the American Osteopathic Association (AOA), and was chartered under New York State law through the efforts of Gov. Nelson A. Rockefeller.  In 1978, Nelson Rockefeller contributed $250,000 to the college's general endowment fund and in 1979 Laurance Rockefeller contributed the same amount.  The friendship between Nelson Rockefeller and W. Kenneth Riland was an important factor in the founding of the medical college.  Dr. Riland served as Mr. Rockefeller’s personal physician during his governorship of New York as well as during his vice-presidency in the Ford administration.  To honor the efforts and contributions of Governor Rockefeller, the Nelson A. Rockefeller Academic Center was dedicated in 1979.

The inaugural class of 34 students graduated on June 11, 1981.  An honorary Doctor of Laws degree was awarded to Dr. W. Kenneth Riland, who was honored for his role in the establishment of the college.  The W. Kenneth Riland Academic Health Care Center, completed in 1984, is located on campus and serves as a clinic and teaching hospital.

In 1999, construction began on campus for the new Hannah and Charles Serota Academic Center. In 2001, the building opened for basic and pre-clinical science lectures, as well as the osteopathic manipulative medicine laboratory.

On December 5, 2012, the 35 year old name of the school was officially changed from New York College of Osteopathic Medicine of New York Institute of Technology (NYCOM of NYIT) to the New York Institute of Technology College of Osteopathic Medicine (NYIT College of Osteopathic Medicine).

Campus
 NYIT-COM OW campus is located on a 1050-acre suburban campus in Old Westbury, New York.
 NYIT-COM JB campus is located on Arkansas State University campus in Jonesboro, AR

Academics

NYIT College of Osteopathic Medicine also has a seven-year combined B.S./D.O. program for qualifying high school students through NYIT as well as SUNY New Paltz, SUNY Geneseo, and SUNY Old Westbury.

The New York Institute of Technology College of Osteopathic Medicine has clinical affiliations with hospitals throughout Long Island, Brooklyn, Bronx, Queens, Upstate New York, New Jersey and Connecticut, most of which are also members of the College of Osteopathic Medicine Educational Consortium (NYCOMEC) for osteopathic post-doctoral education The college provides physicians educated in countries other than the United States the opportunity to obtain medical training in the United States through its Advanced Program for Emigre Physicians (APEP). After completion of the 4-year APEP program, physicians with foreign credentials receive the Doctor of Osteopathic Medicine (D.O.) degree and are able to apply to D.O. and M.D. residency match programs as American graduates. The college provides its alumni and other osteopathic medical graduates with residency and internship training opportunities through the New York Colleges of Osteopathic Medicine Educational Consortium (NYCOMEC). All graduates of the college are eligible to apply for ACGME (M.D.), AOA (D.O.), and dually accredited ACGME-AOA residencies.

Accreditation
The college is accredited by the American Osteopathic Association's Commission on Osteopathic College Accreditation (COCA). It is also listed among the World Directory of Medical Schools as a fully-accredited "medical school in the United States"  along with other accredited doctorate-level allopathic (MD) and osteopathic medicine (DO) programs.

Affiliated Hospitals

Notable alumni
New York Institute of Technology College of Osteopathic Medicine has 6700 alumni as of 2015.
Richard Jadick, U.S. Navy physician who saved the lives of 30 marines and sailors during the Second Battle of Fallujah, earning the Bronze Star. 
Humayun Chaudhry, President and CEO of the Federation of State Medical Boards.
Frank LoVecchio,  medical toxicology academic and researcher
Kevin O’Connor, physician to President Joe Biden and retired U.S. Army Colonel.
 Amit M. Shelat, Vice Chairman of the New York State Board for Medicine, New York State Education Department
 Mikhail "Mike" Varshavski, commonly known as Doctor Mike, is a Russian–American celebrity doctor and famous YouTuber
 Philip Volpe, Retired U.S. Army Major General who served as command surgeon in the First Battle of Mogadishu

References

External links
 NYIT College of Osteopathic Medicine homepage
 NYIT-COM Pulse, a student newspaper

Medical schools in New York (state)
Osteopathic medical schools in the United States
Universities and colleges on Long Island
Educational institutions established in 1977
Universities and colleges in Nassau County, New York
1977 establishments in New York (state)
New York Institute of Technology
Private universities and colleges in New York (state)